Brandon Hunter (born November 24, 1980) is an American former professional basketball player.

After a collegiate career with Ohio University, leading the NCAA in rebounding in 2002–03, he was selected as a 56th pick by the Boston Celtics in the 2003 NBA draft. After playing one season apiece for the Celtics and the Orlando Magic in the NBA, he started a journeyman playing career, mostly in Europe.

High school career 

Hunter attended Withrow High School in his hometown of Cincinnati. With the Tigers he averaged 13 points and 11 rebounds as they reached the state semifinals during his junior year.
He committed to Ohio, playing in the Mid-American Conference (MAC) of the NCAA Division I, prior to his senior year.

In 2017, Brandon was inducted into the Withrow Athletic Hall of Fame with Xavier product and NBA standout Tyrone Hill, Horace Pumphrey (football), Joe Brefeld (baseball, basketball, football) and Skyler Willis (volleyball, track).

College career 

Hunter ranked third for scoring (11.3 ppg) and second in rebounds (6.2 rpg) during his freshman year in 1999–2000, leading to a selection to the MAC All-Freshman Team.

Playing more than nearly 33 minutes per game (first for the team) during his sophomore year, he finished in the conference top five for scoring (18.1 ppg) and rebounding (9.4 rpg, 23rd in nation). Good performances in the MAC tournament, including a record 32 free throw attempts in three games, led to a selection to the All-Tournament Team, also making the 2001 All-MAC First Team.

His junior season provided similar numbers, again leading the team in minutes, scoring (17.3 ppg) and rebounding (9.1 rpg, 41st in nation), with a successive All-MAC First Team selection.
He declared as an early entry candidate for the NBA draft in May 2002 but he did not hire an agent – retaining his eligibility – and declared he would withdraw if he wasn't considered "first-round material", which he did later.

He reached his college career peak as a senior, leading the whole NCAA Division I in 2002–03 with 12.6 rebounds on average.
Hunter added 21.5 points, 2.6 assists, 1.2 blocks and 0.8 steals on average, also leading the nation in doubles-doubles (24). Four MAC Player of the Week nominations would lead to his third consecutive All-MAC First Team selection, on par with former Bobcat Gary Trent, he also led his team in scoring and rebounding for the third season in a row.

His career 1,103 rebounds and 2,012 points allowed him to join the exclusive 2,000 point, 1,000 rebound club.
As of 2015 he ranks as the best rebounder in Ohio University history, the fifth best scorer, joint ninth best shot blocker (87), also ranking first in free throws made (561 out of 923, also first).

Professional career

NBA 
Hunter was selected as a second round draft choice (56th overall) by the Boston Celtics in the 2003 NBA draft. He played in the Reebok Pro Summer League with the Celtics, averaging 16.3 points (fifth for the league, second for the Celtics) and leading the celtics with 8.2 rebounds per game (third overall, ahead of Udonis Haslem and LeBron James) in 32.8 minutes per game (first for the Celtics), being named to the tournament first team alongside Devin Brown of the San Antonio Spurs and Donny Marshall of the New Jersey Nets.
This led to him signing a contract with the Celtics in July 2003.

He played his first NBA game on 9 January 2004, wearing the number 56 as a symbolic nod to his draft position. He played 36 games for the Celtics in his rookie season, averaging 3.5 points and 3.3 rebounds per game in his rookie season. He played in 3 of the 4 games of the playoff series against the Indiana Pacers, who swept the Celtics in four games.

Hunter was left unprotected by the Celtics and was selected by the Charlotte Bobcats in the 2004 NBA Expansion Draft on 22 June 2004. He didn't play a season game for the Bobcats as he was traded to the Orlando Magic for Keith Bogans on 1 November 2004. 
In Orlando he averaged 3.1 points and 2.2 rebounds on average in 31 games.

Hunter's final NBA game ended up being during his time with the Magic. His final game was played on April 20, 2005 in a 93–98 loss to the Miami Heat where he recorded 4 points and 3 rebounds.

He was signed by the Milwaukee Bucks as a free-agent in September 2005 but was waived a month later.
After a stint with the Sioux Falls Skyforce of the Continental Basketball Association Hunter moved overseas.

Brandon was then signed by the Cleveland Cavaliers on 3 October 2006 joining LeBron James and playing in the NBA Summer League before being released two weeks later.

In 2007, he returned to the US and played in the 2007 Summer League for the New Jersey Nets

International 

The American joined Panathinaikos of the Greek Basket League in 2006, playing in two league games and two Euroleague games, after a hand injury in one of the latter games, he was released.

He then joined Carpisa Napoli of the Italian Serie A in March 2006.

Returning to the U.S. after the end of the season, he was signed by the Cleveland Cavaliers on 3 October 2006, playing in the NBA Summer League before being released two weeks later.

Hunter then returned to Italy, signing with  TDShop.it Livorno where he played for the 2006–07 season as Livorno finished last.

After a 2007 Summer League participation for the New Jersey Nets yielded no contract, he joined his third Serie A team, Angelico Biella where he played the whole Serie A season.

He joined Capitanes de Arecibo of the Puerto Rican Baloncesto Superior Nacional later in 2008, leaving in May over disagreements due to him attending tryouts in the U.S., he then played in the Summer League for the New York Knicks.

Hunter returned to Italy for the fourth consecutive year, this time with Premiata Montegranaro, he finished the 2008–09 season as the league's best rebounder.

He joined Hapoel Jerusalem of the Israeli Basketball Super League for the 2009–10 season, with Hapoel reaching the Final Four, whilst they also reached Europe's second tier Eurocup quarterfinals, with Hunter contributing two week MVP performances, in January, and March 2010.

Hunter joined Aliağa Petkim of the Turkish Basketball League, playing part of 2010–11 there before finishing the season with Latvians BK Ventspils.

In 2011–2012 he played with German side BBC Bayreuth in the Basketball Bundesliga.

Returning to Israel, he joined Hapoel Gilboa Galil, playing there until January 2013, when he joined French team Orléans Loiret Basket in the Pro A as an injury replacement player.
He stayed until April 2013, again signing as an injury replacement for French team ALM Évreux Basket, of the second division Pro B.

A stint with Uruguayan champion Club Atlético Aguada of the Liga Uruguaya de Basketball from August to November 2013 was his last playing experience.

Coaching career 
Hunter currently coaches in the Cincinnati area with the private coaching service CoachUp.

Personal life 

As of June 2015, Hunter works as a Real estate broker, he also works as an NBPA and FIBA certified sports agent.

As of June 2021, Hunter founded the full service sports management company Hunter Athlete Management.

Hunter also still holds an endorsement contract with the basketball brand And 1.

See also
 List of NCAA Division I men's basketball season rebounding leaders
 List of NCAA Division I men's basketball players with 2000 points and 1000 rebounds

References

External links
RealGM profile Retrieved on 9 June 2015
Ligue Nationale de Basket profile Retrieved on 9 June 2015 
Turkish Basketball League profile Retrieved on 9 June 2015
Israeli Basketball Super League profile Retrieved on 9 June 2015
Lega Basket Serie A profile Retrieved on 9 June 2015 
NBA profile Retrieved on 9 June 2015

1980 births
Living people
African-American basketball players
Aliağa Petkim basketball players
ALM Évreux Basket players
American expatriate basketball people in France
American expatriate basketball people in Germany
American expatriate basketball people in Greece
American expatriate basketball people in Israel
American expatriate basketball people in Italy
American expatriate basketball people in Latvia
American expatriate basketball people in Turkey
American expatriate basketball people in Uruguay
American men's basketball players
Basket Livorno players
Basket Napoli players
Basketball players from Cincinnati
BK Ventspils players
Boston Celtics draft picks
Boston Celtics players
Capitanes de Arecibo players
Charlotte Bobcats expansion draft picks
Hapoel Gilboa Galil Elyon players
Hapoel Jerusalem B.C. players
Israeli Basketball Premier League players
Lega Basket Serie A players
Medi Bayreuth players
Ohio Bobcats men's basketball players
Orlando Magic players
Orléans Loiret Basket players
Pallacanestro Biella players
Panathinaikos B.C. players
Power forwards (basketball)
Sioux Falls Skyforce (CBA) players
Sutor Basket Montegranaro players
21st-century African-American sportspeople
20th-century African-American people